The pearly razorfish or cleaver wrasse, Xyrichtys novacula, is a species of wrasse.  It is of minor importance to local commercial fisheries and is popular as a game fish.  It can also be found in the aquarium trade.

Description
Xyrichtys novacula can reach  in total length, though most do not exceed . Its body is elongate and very compressed laterally, the head is flattened, with a steep profile and sharp teeth. Its long dorsal fin extends along most of its back.  It has 9 dorsal spines, 12 dorsal soft rays, 3 anal spines and 12 anal soft rays. This wrasse has a yellow-orange or reddish-pink color that is darker on the back and lighter on the belly, sometimes marked with green and gray stripes. Head shows vertical narrow light blue lines and there are scales with brisk reflexes on the abdomen. Upon capture, this fish has been known to turn its mouth and sharp protruding teeth past 90 degrees to either side in relationship to its own body as an attempt to be released from capture.

Distribution and habitat
The pearly razorfish is widespread throughout the western and eastern subtropical and tropical Atlantic Ocean, as well as the Mediterranean Sea. It inhabits clear, shallow littoral areas with sandy or muddy bottoms, at depths of 1 to 20 m. In winter it migrates to greater depths, up to 90–150 m.

Behavior and diet
Xyrichtys novacula buries itself rapidly in the bottom when disturbed. It feeds on small invertebrates such as crustaceans, mollusks and echinoderms.

Synonyms
A large number of specific names have been determined to refer to this species as junior synonyms:

Predators 

The Pearly razorfish has been shown to be successful bait for the Greater Amberjack species (aka reef donkey).

References

External links
 Xyrichtys novacula. Marine Species Identification Portal. Downloaded on 25 May 2013.
 WoRMS

Bibliography 
 Eschmeyer, William N., ed. 1998. Catalog of Fishes. Special Publication of the Center for Biodiversity Research and Information, n. 1, vol. 1-3. California Academy of Sciences. San Francisco, California, USA. 2905. .
 Fenner, Robert M.: The Conscientious Marine Aquarist. Neptune City, New Jersey, USA: T.F.H. Publications, 2001.
 Helfman, G., B. Collette y D. Facey: The diversity of fishes. Blackwell Science, Malden, Massachusetts, USA, 1997.
 Hoese, D.F. 1986: . A M.M. Smith y P.C. Heemstra (eds.) Smiths' sea fishes. Springer-Verlag, Berlín, Germany.
 Maugé, L.A. 1986.  A J. Daget, J.-P. Gosse y D.F.E. Thys van den Audenaerde (eds.) Check-list of the freshwater fishes of Africa (CLOFFA). Bruxelles; Vol. 2.
 Moyle, P. y J. Cech.: Fishes: An Introduction to Ichthyology, 4th. ed, Upper Saddle River, New Jersey, USA: Prentice-Hall. 2000.
 Nelson, J.: Fishes of the World, 3rd. Ed. New York City, USA: John Wiley and Sons. 1994.
 Wheeler, A.: The World Encyclopedia of Fishes, 2nd. Ed., London: Macdonald. 1985.

External links
 

Xyrichtys
Fish of the Atlantic Ocean
Fish of the Mediterranean Sea
Fish described in 1758
Taxa named by Carl Linnaeus